Carex louisianica, commonly called Louisiana sedge, is a species of flowering plant in the sedge family. It is native to North America, where it is primarily found in the southeastern United States. Its natural habitat is wet, swampy forests and openings.

It is a rhizomatous perennial that flowers in spring. It produces fruits in late spring and summer.

References

louisianica